Emamzadeh Qasem may refer to:
 Emamzadeh Qasem, Isfahan
 Emamzadeh Qasem, Lorestan
 Emamzadeh Qasem, Mazandaran
 Emamzadeh Qasem, Qazvin